Anil Gupta may refer to:

 Anil Gupta (philosopher) (born 1949), Indian-American philosopher
 Anil Gupta (writer) (born 1974), British comedy writer and producer
 Anil Rai Gupta (born 1969), Indian businessman
 Anil Das Gupta (1922–1990), Indian cricketer
 Anil K. Gupta (scholar) (born 1949), American academic in the area of business strategy
 Anil Kumar Gupta, scholar in the area of grassroots innovations